This is a list of earthquakes in 1948. Only magnitude 6.0 or greater earthquakes appear on the list. Lower magnitude events are included if they have caused death, injury or damage. Events which occurred in remote areas will be excluded from the list as they wouldn't have generated significant media interest. All dates are listed according to UTC time. This would go down as one of the deadliest years of the 20th century. The main factor behind this was the earthquake which struck Turkmenistan that left 110,000 people dead in early October. This was the deadliest single earthquake since 1923 when a great quake struck Tokyo. Other events during the year caused many deaths including one in Japan in June which resulted in over 5,000 deaths. The number of magnitude 7.0+ events (18) was around normal with the biggest event being in the Philippines measuring 7.8. Clusters of large events were reported in Latin America and the southwest Pacific particularly Fiji in the early part of the year.

Overall

By death toll 

 Note: At least 10 casualties

By magnitude 

 Note: At least 7.0 magnitude

Notable events

January

February

March

April

May

June

July

August

September

October

November

December

References

1948
 
1948